The Blinding Knife is a 2012 epic fantasy novel by New York Times Bestselling author Brent Weeks and the second book in his Lightbringer series following The Black Prism. The novel is written in the third person perspective of several characters and follows protagonist Kip Guile as he discovers his latent magical powers. The Library Journal called the book one of its Seven Not-To-Miss SF/Fantasy Titles for Fall 2012.

Plot
The Blinding Knife begins  four  days  after the end of the previous novel.

The Prism, 'Gavin'/Dazen, sends  Kip back to the Chromeria with Ironfist, instructing him to become a Blackguard. With Karris in tow, the Prism  goes to Seer's Island. Ostensibly he is making a place for the refugees from Garriston's invasion to live. More importantly,   he wishes to speak to a woman with the combined blessing and curse of future-telling. He seeks to locate and thus destroy the blue bane, an island formed from imbalanced blue luxin created from the Prism's loss of control over that color. These temples to color Gods (beings who possess complete mastery of the world-wide reserve for their color, giving them numerous powers including physical manipulation of nearby drafters of this color) attract and perfect the chromaturgy of luxin-infused wights. Eventually, these wights awaken and the God is rebirthed in the form of an avatar. This quest occupies much of the Prism's time for the first third of the novel.

The real Gavin spends much of this time attempting to escape his new prison.

Kip is forced to gamble with his grandfather Andross, playing a card game called 9 Kings. Andross is an expert player, but Kip has only seen others play the game. Thus he loses, badly and repeatedly, allowing Andross to institute various punishments on Kip and Kip's friends. It is unclear whether he is attempting to motivate Kip, or merely to damage him emotionally. Desperate for more knowledge about the game, Kip is eventually led to Janus Borig, a "mirror", who creates new cards for it.

Each new  deck  of   cards a mirror draws  contain  unflinchingly honest depictions of historical events. Each card represents a person or significant object   from  the time when that card's deck was made, with rules for its use in the game that parallel their  advantages and drawbacks in the real world.  After mirrors draw these decks, the cards are  copied and distributed   one or two at a time, spread out over several different decks. Players use  cards that span  dozens of    generations.

The original cards painted by the mirrors are  powerful magical artifacts in their own right. They  allow drafters to physically experience the events depicted in them. Kip attempts this on a random card, and his mind is transported to a ship where an old man writes a treasonous letter to a friend, regarding the red God. He is quickly pulled back to reality before he can learn more.

The Prism returns to the Chromeria, having lost green in addition to blue, to rally the spectrum for war with the Color Prince. Through a great deal of political maneuvering he is successful, though not without making enemies of red,   blue and yellow, and removing  green  altogether. Andross pressures him to marry the green, but he  eventually marries Karris instead. Before Andross can  object properly,  war  is upon them.

Meanwhile, the real Gavin escapes his green prison, thanks to blue bread having been provided by the Prism's room slave. He attempts to bypass the next prison but is ultimately unsuccessful, landing in yellow. Before he can progress further, the Prism comes to speak with him. After a long, intense inner debate, the Prism appears to decide to release Gavin and exile himself. He then shoots Gavin instead.

Now that the Prism has lost control of Green, a Green bane is forming, and conveniently located at the Color Prince's next site for a hostile takeover. He of course intends to harness it to aid him In the midst of his pitched battle with the blackguards, several warships provided by Chromerian allies, and the Prism himself. He sends Liv Danavis to make sure the God's avatar is birthed, and an ally of his to embody the new God once it is birthed. This plan succeeds, but he is killed by Kip (and a cannon shell) regardless. Kip also kills several of the giants guarding him  with his dagger, causing them to revert to normal human form with all their luxin drained from their bodies. The God himself is revealed to be the father of the former Green color.

Kip and the Prism return to their army's flagship, where an enraged Andross berates the Prism for marrying Karris and a host of other offenses, claiming to have begun the process of unseating him. Kip, meanwhile, recognizes  this as the scene in the card, and  Andross as a red wight. In a sudden, fierce confrontation, Kip briefly stabs Andross with his dagger, before a brawl develops.  The Prism briefly considers   killing Kip in order to retrieve the knife before Andross can, but instead  stabs himself with it before diving off the ship. Kip jumps after him.

Andross has had some of his luxin drained by the dagger but not all.  His halos are no longer broken, making him sane once more, with plenty of space now to draft without worrying about the negative implications of his drafting.

The Color Prince congratulates Liv on a job well done.  Having promised her more than she could possibly imagine for completing her task, he delivers on this by insinuating that, once a Superviolet bane is created, he will choose her to be its avatar.  He adds that the Prism has been declared dead, and that he is now unstoppable.

A pirate "rescues" the Prism and Kip. He takes Kip's dagger (which now more closely resembles a broadsword, with a musket mounted on) and the Prism revives. The pirate, called Gunner, decides to keep 'Gavin' but throws Kip back into the ocean. He eventually washes up on the shore, and is captured by Zymun Whiteoak, returning to the Chromeria under Andross's instructions. It is then revealed that Zymun is Kip's half brother, being the child of Karris and the real Gavin who is also Kip's actual father.

The Prism wakes up on the pirate ship. Gunner informs him that he is now "galley slave #6," and as he leaves, 'Gavin' discovers that he is now totally color blind.

Reception
Publishers Weekly gave a mostly positive review for The Blinding Knife, praising the flaws as "realistic" while stating that the book was "familiar". RT Book Reviews called it a "decent effort" but wrote that it felt "derivative of previous epic fantasies, and science fiction works like Ender’s Game".

In 2013, The Blinding Knife won the David Gemmell Legend Award for best fantasy novel.

References

2012 American novels
Novels by Brent Weeks
Third-person narrative novels
Orbit Books books